William Fanshawe (1583 – 4 March 1634) was an English politician who sat in the House of Commons between 1614 and 1625.

Life
Fanshawe was the second son of Thomas Fanshawe, of Ware Park, Hertfordshire and his second wife Joan Smyth, the daughter of Thomas "Customer" Smythe, of Ostenhanger.

Landowner
In 1619, Fanshawe purchased Parsloes Manor and 91 acres attached to it in what is now known as Parsloes Park in Dagenham   £1150 from Edward Osborne. The manor would remain in the Fanshawe family for the next 300 years.

Career
Fanshawe was Auditor for the Duchy of Lancaster. In 1614 he was elected Member of Parliament for Lancaster and entered the East India Company.  In 1619, he acquired the manor of Parsloes, Essex, which was held by his descendants until 1917. He was elected MP for Clitheroe in 1621 and was re-elected MP for Clitheroe in 1624 and 1625.

Fanshawe died at the age of 51. William Fanshawe was the progenitor of the Parsloes Branch of the Fanshawe family. Robert Fanshawe was a descendant of William.

References

 

1583 births
1634 deaths
English MPs 1614
English MPs 1621–1622
English MPs 1624–1625
English MPs 1625
Fanshawe family